Mark Margolis (born November 26, 1939) is an American actor. He is known for playing Alberto "The Shadow" in Scarface, Antonio Nappa in Oz, and Hector Salamanca in Breaking Bad and Better Call Saul. His performance in Breaking Bad was nominated for an Emmy Award in 2012. He regularly performs in the films of Darren Aronofsky, appearing in all but two of his films, and starring in his first film Pi (1998).

Early life
Margolis was born in Philadelphia, Pennsylvania, the son of Fanya (née Fried) and Isidore Margolis. He is from a Jewish family.

Margolis was briefly a student at Temple University before dropping out and moving to New York City. At age 19, he was a student under Stella Adler at the Actors Studio. He was also later trained by Lee Strasberg and Barbara Loden.

Career
Margolis is noted for his supporting roles in Scarface (1983) Ace Ventura: Pet Detective (1994), and the films of Darren Aronofsky: π (1998), Requiem for a Dream (2000), The Fountain (2006), The Wrestler (2008), Black Swan (2010), and Noah (2014).

In 1990, Margolis played Dr. Nel Apgar in an episode of the science fiction television series Star Trek: The Next Generation. In 1991, Margolis played Helmut Dieter in the soap opera Santa Barbara. In addition, he has had recurring roles on numerous other TV shows, including The Equalizer, Quantum Leap, Oz, Law & Order, Crossing Jordan, Californication, and Breaking Bad. In January 2015, he portrayed Felix Faust in the Constantine episode "Quid Pro Quo". For his role in Breaking Bad, Margolis received a nomination for a Primetime Emmy Award for Outstanding Guest Actor in a Drama Series. He would later reprise the role in the show's spin-off series, Better Call Saul.

Margolis is also a stage actor. In the Berkeley Repertory Theater's 2014 season, he appeared as Gus in Tony Kushner's ''The Intelligent Homosexual's Guide to Capitalism and Socialism with a Key to the Scriptures''.

Personal life 
Margolis married his wife, Jacqueline Margolis (née Petcove), on June 3, 1962. They have a son, actor Morgan H. Margolis, and two grandchildren.

Filmography

Film

Television

Music Videos

Video games

Awards and nominations

References

External links

 

1939 births
20th-century American male actors
21st-century American male actors
Male actors from Philadelphia
American male film actors
American male television actors
Jewish American male actors
Living people
Temple University alumni
Actors Studio alumni
Method actors
21st-century American Jews
People from Philadelphia
American stage actors